The Excellence in Broadcasting Lifetime Achievement Award is an honorary Star Award for Television bestowed by the Philippine Movie Press Club to recognize the long-time broadcast journalists of the news, information, public affairs and public service in the media for lifetime achievement within the television industry in the Philippines.

Honorees

2006: Harry Gasser (RPN 9 "Now CNN Philippines 9, ABS-CBN 2)

2007: Mel Tiangco (GMA 7)

2008: Loren Legarda (ABS-CBN 2)

2009: Noli de Castro (ABS-CBN 2)

2010: Che Che Lazaro (ABS-CBN 2)

2011: Jessica Soho (GMA 7)

2012: Tina Monzon-Palma (ANC)

2013: Rey Langit (PTV 4) 

2014: Mike Enriquez (GMA 7)

2015: Maria Ressa (ABS-CBN 2, TV5)

2016: Luchi Cruz-Valdes (TV5)

2017: Martin Andanar (TV5)

2018: Arnold Clavio (GMA 7)

2019: Vicky Morales (GMA 7)

2021: Korina Sanchez (ABS-CBN 2, TV5)

2022: Raffy Tulfo (TV5)

PMPC Star Awards for Television
Lifetime achievement awards